James Scarratt (1868 – 1933) was an English footballer who played on the wing for Burslem Port Vale in the early 1890s.

Career
Scarratt played for Wellington St. George's, before joining Burslem Port Vale in the summer of 1891, soon becoming a regular in the first 11. On 19 September 1891, he walked off the pitch at the Athletic Ground in the second half of a 7–1 win over Loughborough in a Midland League match. He was a member of the side that won the Staffordshire Charity Cup in 1892. He played 20 Second Division games in the 1892–93 season, in the club's first season in the Football League. He scored a goal in a 3–3 draw at Burton Swifts on 18 March 1893. He played 27 of the club's 28 league games in the 1893–94 season, and scored seven league goals. He suffered a serious knee injury in a match on 17 November 1894, which kept him sidelined until March 1895. This limited him to just 13 appearances in the 1894–95 season, scoring one goal in a 4–4 draw with Newcastle United. Upon his recovery he was unable to regain his place in the squad and was released in the summer.

Career statistics
Source:

References

1868 births
1933 deaths
People from Wellington, Shropshire
English footballers
Association football wingers
Port Vale F.C. players
Midland Football League players
English Football League players